The 2022 Kozerki Open was a professional tennis tournament played on hard courts. It was the first edition of the tournament which was part of the 2022 ATP Challenger Tour. It took place in Grodzisk Mazowiecki, Poland between 15 and 21 August 2022.

Singles main-draw entrants

Seeds

 1 Rankings were as of 8 August 2022.

Other entrants
The following players received wildcards into the singles main draw:
  Jerzy Janowicz
  Maks Kaśnikowski
  Szymon Kielan

The following player received entry into the singles main draw as an alternate:
  Gabriel Décamps

The following players received entry from the qualifying draw:
  Skander Mansouri
  Michał Mikuła
  Luca Potenza
  Thiago Seyboth Wild
  Marko Topo
  Alexey Vatutin

Champions

Singles

 Tomáš Macháč def.  Zhang Zhizhen 1–6, 6–3, 6–2.

Doubles

 Robin Haase /  Philipp Oswald def.  Hugo Nys /  Fabien Reboul 6–3, 6–4.

References

2022 ATP Challenger Tour
2022 in Polish tennis
August 2022 sports events in Poland